The 2015 MTN 8 was the 41st edition of South Africa's annual soccer cup competition, the MTN 8. It featured the top eight teams of the Premier Soccer League at the end of the 2014-15 season.

Teams
The eight teams that competed in the MTN 8 knockout competition are (listed according to their finishing position in the 2014/2015 Premier Soccer League Season):
 1. Kaizer Chiefs
 2. Mamelodi Sundowns
 3. Bidvest Wits
 4. Orlando Pirates
 5. Ajax Cape Town
 6. SuperSport United
 7. Bloemfontein Celtic
 8. Maritzburg United

Results

Quarter-finals

Semi-finals

1st Leg

2nd Leg

Final

References

MTN 8
2015–16 in South African soccer
2015 domestic association football cups